GH1 can refer to:

Glycoside hydrolase family 1, a family of enzymes
Growth hormone 1, a human gene
Pseudomonas virus gh1, a bacteriophage which infects some strains of Pseudomonas putida.
Panasonic Lumix DMC-GH1, a digital hybrid still photography/video camera
Guitar Hero (video game), the first game in the series
Hill GH1, 1975 Formula One car